Cartoon was a German television series, created by Vicco von Bülow.

References 

German comedy television series
1960s German television series
1967 German television series debuts
1972 German television series endings
German-language television shows
Das Erste original programming